Kellon Kraaseli (officially Kraaseli) is an island in the Finnish sector of the Bay of Bothnia.

Description

Kellon Kraaseli is located off shore from the village of the  district in Oulu.
The name is derived from the Swedish word gråsäl, meaning "gray seals".

Kellon Kraaseli is a low island, with its highest point only a few meters above sea level.
The island is almost entirely covered by deciduous vegetation.
It has extensive riparian areas which are often covered by high sea water.
The island is used only for summer cottages and harbor protection.

Kellon Kraaseli was used for common pasturage for cows and sheep until the start of the 1980s.
The sea area north of the island is known as Kellonlahti, and the sea area to the east off the coast of Pateniemi is called the Kuivasmeri. 
This stretch of water is fairly sheltered, and is used as a common anchorage for fishing boats during stormy weather.

Gallery

References

Finnish islands in the Baltic
Geography of Oulu
Landforms of North Ostrobothnia